The 1998 NCAA Division II men's basketball tournament was the 42nd annual single-elimination tournament to determine the national champion of men's NCAA Division II college basketball in the United States.

The official culmination of the 1997–98 NCAA Division II men's basketball season, the tournament featured forty-eight teams from around the country.

The Elite Eight, national semifinals, and championship were played at the Commonwealth Convention Center in Louisville, Kentucky.

UC Davis (31–2) defeated Kentucky Wesleyan in the final, 83–77, to win their first Division II national championship. 

The Aggies were coached by Bob Williams. Kentucky Wesleyan's Antonio Garcia, meanwhile, was the Most Outstanding Player.

Regionals

South Atlantic - Spartanburg, South Carolina 
Location: Hodge Center Host: University of South Carolina-Spartanburg

North Central - Brookings, South Dakota 
Location: Frost Arena Host: South Dakota State University

South - Cleveland, Mississippi 
Location: Walter Sillers Coliseum Host: Delta State University

Great Lakes - Owensboro, Kentucky 
Location: Sportscenter Host: Kentucky Wesleyan College

Northeast - Albany, New York 
Location: Events and Athletics Center Host: College of Saint Rose

East - Salem, West Virginia 
Location: T. Edward Davis Gymnasium Host: Salem-Teikyo University

South Central - Canyon, Texas 
Location: West Texas Fieldhouse Host: West Texas A&M University

West - Davis, California 
Location: The Pavilion Host: University of California, Davis

Elite Eight - Louisville, Kentucky
Location: Commonwealth Convention Center Host: Bellarmine College

All-tournament team
 Antonio Garcia, Kentucky Wesleyan (MOP)
 Dana Williams, Kentucky Wesleyan
 Jason Cox, UC Davis
 Dante Ross, UC Davis
 William Davis, Virginia Union

See also
1998 NCAA Division II women's basketball tournament
1998 NCAA Division I men's basketball tournament
1998 NCAA Division III men's basketball tournament
1998 NAIA Division I men's basketball tournament
1998 NAIA Division II men's basketball tournament

References
 NCAA Division II men's basketball tournament Results
 1998 NCAA Division II men's basketball tournament jonfmorse.com

NCAA Division II men's basketball tournament
Tournament
NCAA Division II basketball tournament
NCAA Division II basketball tournament